Alantsilodendron is a genus of flowering plants in the legume family, Fabaceae. It belongs to the mimosoid clade of the subfamily Caesalpinioideae.

References

Mimosoids
Fabaceae genera